Moghavemat Alborz Futsal Club (Bashgah-e Futsal-e Miqavâmit Alberz) is an Iranian professional futsal club based in Karaj.

Crest

Season to season
The table below chronicles the achievements of the Club in various competitions.

Last updated: 15 July 2022

Players

Current squad

Personnel

Current technical staff

Last updated: 17 December 2022

References 

Futsal clubs in Iran
Karaj
Sport in Alborz Province